Mikhail Zhelev (15 July 1943 – 5 January 2021) was a Bulgarian athlete, known primarily for running the steeplechase.  He competed in the 1968 Summer Olympics, finishing 6th and in the 1972 Summer Olympics, finishing 12th.  He set his personal record of 8:25.0 while winning the race at the 1969 European Athletics Championships.

References

1943 births
2021 deaths
Bulgarian male steeplechase runners
Bulgarian male long-distance runners
Olympic athletes of Bulgaria
Athletes (track and field) at the 1968 Summer Olympics
Athletes (track and field) at the 1972 Summer Olympics
European Athletics Championships medalists
Universiade medalists in athletics (track and field)
Sportspeople from Sliven
Universiade gold medalists for Bulgaria
Medalists at the 1970 Summer Universiade